Fred Van Buren Archer (October 6, 1888 – January 1971) was the head football coach for the University of North Dakota Fighting Sioux football team. He compiled an overall record of 2–4. He was born in Vevay, Indiana in 1888.

Archer was from Ottawa, Illinois He was a graduate of Hanover College, having received a Bachelor of Science degree there in 1910. He was also a member of the Phi Gamma Delta fraternity during his college years. 

Before coming to North Dakota, Archer taught at a school in McCook, Nebraska and later, in 1912, chemistry and physics at Ottawa, Illinois. He married Gladys Richardson in Boston, Massachusetts, on June 1, 1914. Archer was living in Lexington, Massachusetts in 1925. He died at Winchester, Massachusetts in 1971.

Head coaching record

References

1888 births
1971 deaths
Basketball coaches from Indiana
North Dakota Fighting Hawks football coaches
North Dakota Fighting Hawks men's basketball coaches
People from Vevay, Indiana